The 1990–91 NOFV-Pokal was the last edition of the East German Cup. During the competition, following German reunification in October 1990, the cup had been renamed from the FDGB-Pokal. After the 1990–91 season, the East German competitions were merged into the (West) German system, with clubs from the East now entering the DFB-Pokal.

The competition was won by F.C. Hansa Rostock, who beat Stahl Eisenhüttenstadt in the final. Hansa Rostock had also won the league title, so Eisenhüttenstadt qualified for the following year's Cup Winners' Cup. Both finalists competed in the 1991 DFB-Supercup.

1st round

Bye to round 2: Rotation Berlin, FC Carl Zeiss Jena, Wismut Aue Amateure

2nd Round

Round of 16

Quarter-final

Semi-final

Final

External links 
 DDR Football 1990/91 at rsssf.com

FDGB-Pokal seasons
East
Cup